Amanoa anomala is a species of plant in the family Phyllanthaceae. It is endemic to Ecuador.  Its natural habitat is subtropical or tropical moist lowland forests.

References

anomala
Endemic flora of Ecuador
Critically endangered flora of South America
Taxonomy articles created by Polbot